Suresh Singh Wangjam (born 7 August 2000), is an Indian professional footballer who plays as a midfielder for Indian Super League club Bengaluru and India national team. He won the 2020–21 AIFF Emerging Player of the Year award. He also represented India in the FIFA U-17 World Cup in 2017.

Career
Born in Manipur and nicknamed as El Torito and Gooli Suresha, Wangjam was part of the AIFF Elite Academy batch that was preparing for the 2017 FIFA U-17 World Cup to be hosted in India. After the tournament, Wangjam was selected to play for the Indian Arrows, an All India Football Federation-owned team that would consist of India under-20 players to give them playing time. He made his professional debut for the side in the Arrow's first match of the season against Chennai City. He started and played the whole match as Indian Arrows won 3–0.

International
Wangjam represented the India under-17 side which participated in the 2017 FIFA U-17 World Cup which was hosted in India.
He made his senior team debut on 25 March 2021 in an 1-1 draw match against Oman.

Career statistics

Club

International

International goals

Honours

International 

India
SAFF Championship: 2021

Individual 

 AIFF Emerging Player of the Year: 2020–21

References

2000 births
Living people
People from Manipur
Indian footballers
AIFF Elite Academy players
Indian Arrows players
Bengaluru FC players
Association football midfielders
Footballers from Manipur
I-League players
India youth international footballers
India international footballers
Indian Super League players